The following is an incomplete list of notable integrated circuit (i.e. microchip) manufacturers. Some are in business, others are defunct and some are Fabless.

0–9
3dfx Interactive (acquired by Nvidia in 2002)

A
Achronix
Actions Semiconductor
Adapteva
Agere Systems (now part of LSI Logic formerly part of Lucent, which was formerly part of AT&T)
Agilent Technologies (formerly part of Hewlett-Packard, spun off in 1999)
Airgo Networks (acquired by Qualcomm in 2006)
Alcatel
Alchip
Altera
Allegro Microsystems
Allwinner Technology
Alphamosaic (acquired by Broadcom in 2004)
AMD (Advanced Micro Devices; founded by ex-Fairchild employees)
Analog Devices
Apple Inc.
Applied Materials
Applied Micro Circuits Corporation (AMCC)
ARM
Asahi Kasei Microdevices (AKM)
AT&T
Atari
Atheros (acquired by Qualcomm in 2011)
ATI Technologies (Array Technologies Incorporated; acquired parts of Tseng Labs in 1997; in 2006, became a wholly owned subsidiary of AMD)
Atmel (co-founded by ex-Intel employee, now part of Microchip Technology)
Amkor Technology
ams AG (formerly known as austriamicrosystems AG and frequently still known as AMS (Austria Mikro Systeme))

B
Bourns, Inc.
Brite Semiconductor
Broadcom Corporation (acquired by Avago Technologies in 2016)
Broadcom Inc. (formerly Avago Technologies)
BroadLight
Burr-Brown Corporation (Acquired by Texas Instruments in 2000)

C
C-Cube Microsystems
Calxeda (re-emerged with Silver Lining Systems in 2014)
Cavium
CEITEC
Chips and Technologies (acquired by Intel in 1997)
CISC Semiconductor
Cirrus Logic
Corsair
Club 3D (Formerly Colour Power)
Commodore Semiconductor Group (formerly MOS Technologies)
Conexant (formerly Rockwell Semiconductor, acquired by Synaptics in 2017)
Crocus Technology
CSR plc (formerly Cambridge Silicon Radio)
Cypress Semiconductor Now operating as subsidiary of Infineon Technologies.It was (acquired by Infineon Technologies in 2019).

D
D-Wave Systems
Dallas Semiconductor (acquired by Maxim Integrated in 2001)
Dynex Semiconductor

E
Elmos Semiconductor
EM Microelectronic-Marin (subsidiary of The Swatch Group)
Entropic Communications (acquired by MaxLinear in 2015)
Epistar
Epson
ESS Technology
Everspin Technologies
Exar Corporation (established as a subsidiary of Rohm Semiconductor, acquired by MaxLinear in 2017)
EZchip Semiconductor (acquired by Mellanox Technologies in 2016)

F
Fagor (owned by Mondragon Corporation)
Fairchild Semiconductor
Ferranti
Freescale Semiconductor (formerly part of Motorola, merged in 2015 with NXP)
FTDI
Fujifilm
Fujitsu

G
G.Skill
General Instrument (semiconductor division acquired by Vishay Intertechnology in 2001)
Genesis Microchip
GlobalFoundries
GM Components Holdings
GMT Microelectronics (formerly Commodore Semiconductor Group)
GreenPeak Technologies (acquired by Qorvo in 2016)

H
Harris Semiconductor (acquired by Intersil)
HannStar Display Corporation
HiSilicon
Hitachi, Ltd.
Holtek

I
IBM (International Business Machines)
IM Flash Technologies (founded by Intel Corporation and Micron Technology, Inc.)
Imagination Technologies (acquired by Canyon Bridge in 2017)
Infineon Technologies (formerly part of Siemens)
InfoTM 
Ingenic Semiconductor
Inmos
Inprocomm (acquired by MediaTek in 2005)
Integra Technologies
International Rectifier (now part of Infineon Technologies since 2015)
Integrated Device Technology
Intel (founded by ex-Fairchild employees)
Intersil (formerly Harris Semiconductor, bought by Renesas in 2017)
Intrinsity (acquired by Apple Inc. in 2010)
InvenSense (acquired by TDK in 2016)
Industrial Technology Research Institute
IXYS Corporation

J
Jazz Semiconductor (acquired by Tower Semiconductor in 2008)
Jennic Limited (acquired by NXP Semiconductors in 2010)

K
Kawasaki
Kyocera
Kingston Technology

L
Lattice Semiconductor
Leadcore Technology
Linear Technology (now under Analog Devices since 2016)
Littelfuse
Lantiq (acquired by Intel in 2015)
LSI Logic (founded by ex-Fairchild employees)

M
M-Labs (formerly known as the Milkymist project)
M-Systems (acquired by SanDisk in 2006)
Macronix
Magnum Semiconductor (acquired by GigOptix in 2016)
MaxLinear
Maxim Integrated Products
Marvell Technology Group
MediaTek
Mellanox Technologies
Mentor Graphics (subsidiary of Siemens)
Microchip Technology 
Micron Technology
Microsemi (acquired by Microchip Technology in 2018)
MicroSystems International
Mindspeed Technologies (spun off from Conexant)
MIPS Technologies (acquired by Imagination Technologies in 2013, Imagination Technologies later sold the company to Tallwood Venture Capital in 2017)
Mitsubishi Electric
MOS Technology (founded by Allen-Bradley)
Mosel Vitelic Corporation (defunct in 2009)
Mosel Vitelic Inc
Mostek (founded by ex-Texas Instruments employees)
Motorola (semiconductor division spun off as Freescale Semiconductor)

N
National Semiconductor (aka "NatSemi"; founded by ex-Fairchild employees, bought in 2011 by Texas Instruments)
NEC (semiconductor division merged with Renesas Electronics)
NetLogic Microsystems (acquired by Broadcom Corporation in 2012)
Nexperia (Spin-off from NXP, founded in 2017)
Nichia
Nintendo
Nordic Semiconductor (formerly known as Nordic VLSI)
Novellus Systems
Nvidia (acquired IP of competitor 3dfx in 2000; 3dfx was co-founded by ex-SGI employee)
NXP Semiconductors (formerly part of Philips)
Number Nine Visual Technology (acquired by S3 Graphics in 2000)
Nuvoton (Winbond spun off)

O
OSRAM 
Oak Technology (acquired by Zoran Corporation in 2003)
ON Semiconductor (formerly part of Motorola)
Open-Silicon

P
Phison
Parallax Inc.
Philips Semiconductors (spun off as NXP Semiconductors)
Plessey
PLX Technology (acquired by Avago Technologies, now Broadcom Inc.)
PMC-Sierra (from the former Pacific Microelectronics Centre and Sierra Semiconductor, the latter co-founded by ex-NatSemi employee)
Panasonic (formerly known as Matsushita Electric Industrial Co., Ltd.)
PortalPlayer (acquired by Nvidia in 2007)
Powerchip Semiconductor
Precision Monolithics (Acquired by Analog Devices in 1990)

Q
Qualcomm
Qimonda (split off from Infineon Technologies AG which was formerly part of Siemens)
Qorvo

R
Rabbit Semiconductor (acquired by Digi International in 2006)
Ralink (acquired by MediaTek in 2011)
Rambus
RCA
Realtek
Renesas Technology (joint venture of Hitachi and Mitsubishi Electric)
Reticon
RF Micro Devices (merged with TriQuint Semiconductor to form Qorvo in 2015)
Ricoh
Rise Technology (acquired by Silicon Integrated Systems in 1999)
Robert Bosch
Rockchip
Rockwell Semiconductor (spun off as Conexant)
Rohm
Roland Corporation
RMI Corporation (Merged into NetLogic Microsystems, then Broadcom)

S
Samsung Electronics (Semiconductor division)
Sanyo (Semiconductor division sold off to ON Semiconductor in 2010)
Sanken Electric
SanDisk (acquired by Western Digital in 2016)
Seagate Technology
Sensonor (acquired by Infineon Technologies in 2012)
Sharp Corporation (Sharp Semiconductor division)
SiFive
Signetics (acquired by Philips (now NXP) in 1975)
Sigma Designs
SigmaTel (acquired by Freescale which merged with NXP in 2015)
Silicon Motion
Silicon Systems (now part of Western Digital)
Silicon Labs
Silicon Image (acquired by Lattice Semiconductor in 2015)
Silicon Integrated Systems
SK Hynix
Skyworks Solutions (spun-off from Conexant)
Sony (Semiconductor division)
SMIC
Spansion
Spreadtrum
STMicroelectronics (formerly SGS Thomson)
ST-Ericsson (defunct in 2013)
Sun Microsystems (acquired by Oracle Corporation in 2010)
Symbios Logic (sold to Hyundai Electronics in 1995)
Synertek

T
Tamarack Microelectronics (merged with IC Plus in 2002)
TDK
Telechips
Tektronix (semiconductor division sold to Maxim Integrated in 1994)
Teridian Semiconductor
Texas Instruments
Tilera (acquired by EZchip Semiconductor, EZchip was later acquired by Mellanox Technologies)
Toshiba
Tower Semiconductor
Transmeta (acquired by Novafora in 2009)
TriQuint Semiconductor (merged with RF Micro Devices to form Qorvo in 2015)
Truly International Holdings
Trumpf
TSMC (Taiwan Semiconductor Manufacturing Company. semiconductor foundry)

U
UMC (company)
u-blox
Ubicom (formerly Scenix Semiconductor, acquired by Qualcomm Atheros in 2012)
UNISOC

V
Vanguard International Semiconductor Corporation
VIA Technologies (founded by ex-Intel employee, part of Formosa Plastics Group)
Vimicro
Virata Corporation (merged with Conexant in 2004)
Vishay Intertechnology
Vivante Corporation
Volterra Semiconductor

W
Wacom
Western Digital
Wilocity (acquired by Qualcomm Atheros in 2014)
Winbond
Wolfson Microelectronics
WonderMedia

X
X-Fab
Xelerated (acquired by Marvell Technology Group in 2012)
Xilinx (founded by ex-ZiLOG employee)
XMOS

Y
Yamaha Corporation

Z
ZiLOG (founded by ex-Intel employees, part of Exxon 1980–89; now owned by TPG)
Zoran Corporation (merged with CSR (company) PLC which was later merged to Qualcomm)

References

Electronics lists
Lists of manufacturers